Pinky and Perky is a children's television series first broadcast by BBC TV in 1957, and revived in 2008 as a computer-animated adaptation.

Original series
The title characters are a pair of anthropomorphic puppet pigs, named Pinky and Perky, who were originally going to be named Pinky and Porky but there was a problem registering Porky as a character name. This was solved by Margaret Potter, the wife of their producer, Trevor Hill, who also discovered them, when she woke him up one night announcing "I've got it! Pinky and Perky!" They were created by Czechoslovakian immigrants Jan and Vlasta Dalibor who moved to the village of Houndhill, leaving the pigs under the cupboard in The Bungalow. The characters of pigs were chosen because the pig is seen as a symbol of good luck in the former Czechoslovakia. The puppets, who had only very limited movements, looked very alike. Pinky wore red clothes and Perky wore blue, but this distinction was of little use on monochrome TV, so Perky often wore a hat.

Pinky and Perky spoke and sang in high-pitched voices, created by re-playing original voice recordings at twice the original recorded speed; the vocals were sung by Mike Sammes while the backing track was played at half normal speed (Sammes did the same job for Ken Dodd's Diddymen, as Ross Bagdasarian did for the original Chipmunks in the early 1960s)—hence the expression "Pinky and Perky speed", when an LP record is played at 45 rpm or 78 rpm instead of the correct 33 rpm. Pinky and Perky would often sing cover versions of popular songs, but also had their own theme song, "We Belong Together".

They had their own fictional TV station "PPC TV" (a play on "BBC"). They also performed comedy sketches usually with a human foil (similar to Basil Brush). Actor John Slater worked with them as a straight man for many years, enduring soakings from water pistols and similar pranks. Other human companions included Roger Moffat, Jimmy Thompson, Bryan Burdon and Fred Emney.

Their show included other puppets such as the Beakles (an avian parody of the Beatles), Topo Gigio, a mouse puppet who appeared in many later episodes, as well as a female pig. Other puppets included Ambrose Cat, Basil Bloodhound, Bertie Bonkers the baby elephant, Conchita the Cow, Horace Hare and Vera Vixen.

Pinky and Perky also performed guest slots on other shows, including several appearances on Sunday Night at the London Palladium.

The puppets also appeared on TV in the United States on a number of episodes of The Ed Sullivan Show: 532 (14 September 1958), 548 (4 January 1959), 573 (5 July 1959), 740 (10 March 1963), 780 (23 February 1964, where they shared the bill with the Beatles and Morecambe and Wise) and 908 (26 February 1967).

The pigs featured in series, such as Pinky and Perky's Pop Parade and Pinky and Perky's Island, for 11 years until 1968 on the BBC before transferring to ITV until 1972. There were no real people, sketches or stories in the shows at all. Instead, the puppets would be seen lip-synching and dancing to songs by the likes of Petula Clark. In this incarnation, each episode would end with the characters singing the Scaffold's hit "Thank U Very Much". At this point, there would be the only piece of spoken dialogue, which went along these lines:

 "Who's going to say it?"
 "Oh, let me!"
 "No!  I want to!"
 "All right, then, let's do it together!  Ready—MUCH!"

Other shows and appearances
The characters enjoyed a brief revival in the 1990s, on the short-lived children's series The Pig Attraction. A children's annual was also produced in the '60s featuring their adventures.

The Pinky and Perky Show reappeared in an all-new CGI-animated television series on CBBC and France 3, beginning in November 2008 on BBC One. There are 52 episodes, each 13 minutes in length. Some of the old characters remained in the show, such as Vera Vixen (who often hatches schemes to try to get rid of the two pigs) and Morton Frog (who works in the production control room, usually running the end titles [or in "Cartoon Mash-Up", cueing the end music] at the end of an episode.). Alongside them, there were a host of new characters, such as K.T. the studio manager cat, Wilberforce the tortoise security guard (who comes up with impractical ideas for new acts or games for the show), and a pair of poodle receptionists called Tara and Tamara (who, in a recurring gag, often get Pinky and Perky's names wrong). There is also a steady stream of special 'celebrity' guests, many of which spoof better-known franchises, such as Doctor Who as "Dr. Roo" and Harry Potter as "Harry Trotter". The series was produced by Lupus Films, and line produced by Sally Marchant.

A DVD of the new look Pinky and Perky, featuring eight episodes from the new series, entitled Licence to Swill was released in 2009.

Comics

A comic strip based on the TV series was drawn by Jim Turnbull.

Discography

Albums
 Pinky and Perky's Melodymaster (Columbia, 1963)
 Pinky and Perky's Hit Parade (MFP, 1968)
 Christmas with Pinky and Perky (MFP, 1969)
 Pinky and Perky's Nursery Rhymes (MFP, 1970)
 Pinky and Perky's Film Parade (MFP, 1970)
 Pinky and Perky's Hit Parade No. 2 (MFP, 1971)
 Pinky and Perky Have a Party (MFP, 1972)
 Pinky and Perky's Hit Parade No. 3 (MFP, 1973)
 Singalong Party (MFP, 1974)
 Pinky and Perky's Pop Parade (MFP, 1975)
 The Pig Attraction (also released on CD) (Telstar, 1993)

EPs

 Children's Choice with Pinky and Perky (Columbia, 1960)
 Children's Favourites with Pinky and Perky (Columbia, 1961)
 Christmas with Pinky and Perky (Columbia, 1961)
 Pinky and Perky Out West (Columbia, 1962)
 Pinky and Perky's Pals (Columbia, 1962)
 Pinky and Perky Down on the Farm (Columbia, 1963)
 Nursery Romp (Columbia, 1963)
 Pinky and Perky at the Circus (Columbia, 1964)
 Pinky and Perky's Beat Party (Columbia, 1965)
 Pinky and Perky in Outer Space (Columbia, 1965)
 Playtime (Columbia, 1966)
 Celebration Day (Columbia, 1966)
 Pinky and Perky's Summer Holiday (Columbia, 1967)
 Up, Up and Away (Columbia, 1967)
 Coming Your Way (Columbia, 1968)

Singles
All singles were released on 7" vinyl format unless otherwise stated.
 "Tom Dooley"/"The Velvet Glove" (also released on 78 rpm) (Decca, 1958)
 "Does Your Chewing Gum Lose Its Flavour (On the Bedpost Overnight?)"/"The Little Mountaineer (Il Piccolo Montanaro)" (also released on 78 rpm) (Decca, 1959)
 "Pinky and Perky's Party Sing-Song" (Medley) (Decca, 1959)
 "Clinkerated Chimes" (signature tune of Pinky and Perky's Pop Parade) (Instrumental) (RCA, 1959)
 "Clinkerated Chimes" (signature tune of Pinky and Perky's Pop Parade)/Cradle of Love (Decca, 1960)
 "The Ugly Duckling"/"Eeny Meeny Miney Mo" (Columbia, 1960)
 "What's New at the Zoo" (from Do Re Mi)/"Dream Your Tears Away" (Columbia, 1961)
 "The Valley of Christmas Trees"/"I Saw Mommy Kissing Santa Claus" (Columbia, 1961)
 "What Have We Got? (We Got Music)"/"Give Us a Kiss for Christmas" (Columbia, 1962)
 "The Ice-Cream Man"/"Volare (Nel Blu Dipinto Di Blu)" (Columbia, 1963)
 "When The Saints Go Marching In"/"Nursery Romp" (Columbia, 1963)
 "Hole in My Bucket"/"Glow Worm" (Columbia, 1965)
 "Winnie The Pooh"/"We Belong Together" (Columbia, 1966)
 "Those Magnificent Men in Their Flying Machines"/"Yellow Submarine" (MFP, 1968)
 "The Holly and the Ivy"/"While Shepherds Watched" (MFP, 1969)
 "Consider Yourself" (from "Oliver")/"I Wanna Be Like You" (from The Jungle Book) (MFP, 1970)
 "Pushbike Song"/"Jack-In-The-Box" (MFP, 1971)
 "Bridget the Midget"/"Rosetta" (MFP, 1971)
 "The Grand Old Duke of York"/"London Bridge Is Falling Down" (MFP, 1972)
 "Together Whevever We Go"/"Long Haired Lover From Liverpool" (MFP, 1973)
 "Everything Is Beautiful"/"Tie a Yellow Ribbon Round the Ole Oak Tree" (MFP, 1973)
 "Ma (He's Making Eyes at Me)"/"High Hopes" (MFP, 1974)
 "Oh Boy"/"Sing Baby Sing" (MFP, 1975)
 "Give Us a Kiss for Christmas"/"I Saw Mommy Kissing Santa Claus"/"Nursery Romp" (also released as a CD-single with bonus track "The Ugly Duckling") (EMI, 1990)
 "Reet Petite"/"It Only Takes a Minute Girl" (also released as a cassette single and a CD-single with bonus track "Thunderbirds Are Go! [Straight Run Mix]") (Telstar, 1993)

Cultural references

 In Nick Hornby's 1998 novel About a Boy, the main character, Will, visits the record shop Championship Vinyl and sees an attractive woman asking for a Pinky and Perky record. She is met with contempt from the sales clerk. A few days later Will thinks he sees the woman again and, trying to make an impression, introduces himself with the line "I like Pinky and Perky", only to suddenly realize that it's a different woman.
 Pinky and Perky are mentioned in Richard Thompson's song "Let It Blow" which is the first track of his 2005 album Front Parlour Ballads.
 The two appear in The Goodies episode The Goodies Rule – O.K.? where they sound a buzzer ("Not so fast!").
 Pinky and Perky are mentioned in The Bank Job, a 2008 British crime film, in reference to two supporting characters.
 In BBC1's Red Dwarf episode "Better Than Life", Rimmer refers to the Skutters as "Pinky and smegging Perky".
 In BBC1's The Good Life, the pigs adopted by Barbara and Tom Good are named Pinky and Perky.
 In BBC2's Top Gear and Amazon Prime's The Grand Tour, James May refers to co-presenters Jeremy Clarkson and Richard Hammond as Pinky and Perky.
 BBC1's Call the Midwife, set in the late 1950s, makes several references to Pinky and Perky.
 Pinky and Perky are mentioned in the 1993 movie In the Name of the Father, when the protagonist is eating pork sausages.
 In Collett Dickenson Pearce's 1976–1977 award-winning advertising campaign for Wall's, an ad featuring an image of a pork pie carries the headline "Pinky and Porky", a pun on "Pinky and Perky".

Notes

External links
 
 Watch The Pinky and Perky Show on BBC iplayer
 Pinky and Perky tribute (fan) site
 Pinky and Perky, original show images at children's television programs website thechestnut.com
 Chapter 17 in Over the Airwaves, Trevor Hill's autobiography (Book Guild 2005)

British television shows featuring puppetry
Animated television series about pigs
BBC children's television shows
British music television shows
British children's animated comedy television series
Fictional pigs
ITV children's television shows
Television shows produced by Thames Television
Television series by FremantleMedia Kids & Family
1957 British television series debuts
1968 British television series endings
1998 British television series debuts
1950s British children's television series
1960s British children's television series
1970s British children's television series
Television shows adapted into comics